This page provides links to other pages comprising the list of airports in Europe.

Lists by country
Due to the number of airports, each country or territory has a separate list:
 list of airports in Albania
 list of airports in Austria
 list of airports in Belarus
 list of airports in Belgium
 list of airports in Bosnia and Herzegovina
 list of airports in Bulgaria
 list of airports in Croatia
 list of airports in Cyprus
 list of airports in the Czech Republic
 list of airports in Denmark
 list of airports in Estonia
 list of airports in Finland
 list of airports in France
list of airports in Georgia
 list of airports in Germany
 list of airports in Greece
 list of airports in Hungary
 list of airports in Iceland
 list of airports in the Republic of Ireland
 list of airports in Italy
 list of airports in Kosovo
 list of airports in Latvia
 list of airports in Lithuania
 list of airports in Luxembourg
 list of airports in Malta
 list of airports in Moldova
 list of airports in Montenegro
 list of airports in the Netherlands
 list of airports in North Macedonia
list of airports in Norway
list of airports in Poland
list of airports in Portugal
list of airports in Romania
list of airports in Russia
list of airports in Serbia
list of airports in Slovakia
list of airports in Slovenia
list of airports in Spain
list of airports in Sweden
list of airports in Switzerland
list of airports in Transnistria
list of airports in Turkey
list of airports in Ukraine
list of airports in the United Kingdom

Countries without airports

The five European microstates have no airport within their boundaries, though San Marino does have a small airfield with a grass runway. Each has at least one heliport and all except Monaco are landlocked. The only heliport to have a Schengen border control is in Monaco. For Liechtenstein, San Marino and Vatican City only flights inside the Schengen Area are allowed, due to a lack of border controls. Andorra is more unregulated.

Andorra 

Andorra has no airports for fixed-wing aircraft, but it has Andorra la Vella Heliport in the capital city of Andorra la Vella, as well as heliports in La Massana and Arinsal. The nearest airports with scheduled commercial service are Carcassonne Airport and Perpignan-Rivesaltes Airport in France, and Lleida-Alguaire Airport in Spain. The nearest major airports are Barcelona-El Prat Airport and Girona-Costa Brava Airport in Spain, and Toulouse-Blagnac Airport in France, which all have transfers to Andorra by bus. All these airports except La Seu d'Urgell need around three hours to reach by car.

Liechtenstein  

Liechtenstein does not have an airport, but does have a heliport in the southern town of Balzers. The nearest international airports are St. Gallen-Altenrhein Airport in Switzerland and Friedrichshafen Airport in Germany, which have few scheduled flights. The nearest major airport is Zurich Airport in Switzerland, which has rail service to Buchs and Sargans. From these towns, it is possible to catch a Postal Bus or a train to Liechtenstein.

Monaco 

Monaco has no airports, but does have Monaco Heliport in the Monégasque district of Fontvieille. The nearest airport is Nice Côte d'Azur Airport in France. The heliport has a Schengen border control, so it is possible to fly from e.g. London or Tunis, although this will take a few hours, and few helicopters have such range.

San Marino 

San Marino does not have a commercial airport, but does have a small airfield in Torraccia with a  grass runway owned by the AeroClub San Marino. There is also a heliport in Borgo Maggiore. The nearest airport is Rimini's Federico Fellini Airport in Italy, with transfers available by bus to San Marino.

Vatican City

However, it does have Vatican City Heliport in the western corner, which is used for visiting heads and officials of the city-state. The nearest airport is Rome Ciampino Airport in Italy.

See also
 Wikipedia:WikiProject Aviation/Airline destination lists: Europe
 List of the busiest airports in Europe
 List of the busiest airports in the Baltic states
 List of the largest airports in the Nordic countries

References

External links
Flash Map for Airports in Europe

Lists of airports